Ana Patricia Mora Castellanos (born 13 January 1951) is a Costa Rican sociologist, university professor, and politician.

Biography
Patricia Mora Castellanos was born on 13 January 1951. She was president of the National Executive Committee of the Broad Front and a deputy for that party, as well as a member of its Political Commission and the Organizing Committee. She was married to José Merino del Río (leader of the Costa Rican left) from 1977 until his death in 2012, and is the daughter of Communist leader . She is the niece of Manuel Mora, founder of the country's Communist Party and one of the fathers of the Social Guarantees of the 1940s. She is also the mother of filmmaker Maricarmen Merino and philosopher Dr. Alejandra Merino.

Mora is a sociologist and professor of general studies at the University of Costa Rica. She was a founding member of the Broad Front alongside her husband, and was its representative before the Foro de São Paulo as a member of its Political Commission and the Executive Committee. She was elected deputy for the party in the 2014 general election.

Mora was secretary of the Legislative Assembly's commission that investigated the political scandal known as the "", where the loan of $31.5 million from the Banco de Costa Rica to the construction entrepreneur Juan Carlos Bolaños was questioned. The case of alleged influence peddling would involve members of the three Supreme Powers (deputies, the Supreme Court of Justice, and the Presidency).

References

External links
 
 Patricia Mora Castellanos at the  

1951 births
Broad Front (Costa Rica) politicians
Living people
Members of the Legislative Assembly of Costa Rica
North American sociologists
Women sociologists
Place of birth missing (living people)
Academic staff of the University of Costa Rica
21st-century Costa Rican women politicians
21st-century Costa Rican politicians
Government ministers of Costa Rica
Women government ministers of Costa Rica
Women's ministers